Jean Snella (9 December 1914 – 20 November 1979) was a French association football midfielder and a manager. He mostly coached AS Saint-Etienne. He also coached  France national football team along with José Arribas after the FIFA World Cup 1966.

In 1940, he was made Prisoner of War in Évreux by the Wehrmacht but managed to escape in 1942.

Honours
 Division 1: 1957, 1964, 1967
 Axpo Super League: 1961, 1962
 Schweizer Cup: 1971

External links and references

References
Profile
Playing career

1914 births
1979 deaths
French footballers
Association football midfielders
AS Saint-Étienne players
French football managers
FC Lorient managers
AS Saint-Étienne managers
Expatriate football managers in Algeria
Servette FC managers
OGC Nice managers
France national football team managers
FC Metz managers
World War II prisoners of war held by Germany
French military personnel of World War II
French prisoners of war in World War II
French expatriate sportspeople in Algeria
Olympique Lillois players